Ohio Township, Ohio may refer to:

Ohio Township, Clermont County, Ohio
Ohio Township, Gallia County, Ohio
Ohio Township, Monroe County, Ohio

Ohio township disambiguation pages